The Kidd Metallurgical Site (or Met Site) is a metallurgical facility in Timmins, Ontario, Canada.  It was built in 1980 and owned and operated by Xstrata Copper, following their 2006 takeover of Falconbridge Ltd.  The site employs approximately 675 hourly employees.

The Met Site was built away from the mine because of the muskeg-like terrain surrounding the mine.

The Met Site processes material from the Kidd Mine and outside sources, and employs 875 people.  Of the 875 employees 125 work at the concentrator, 205 in the copper operations and 275 in the zinc facilities.  The remainder of the employees are support staff.

Xstrata announced its plans to close the Metallurgical Site in May 2010. Only the concentrator will remain as the ore will now be shipped to Québec. The demolition of the rest of the plant started in February 2011.

References

Metallurgical facilities
Economy of Timmins
Buildings and structures in Timmins
Xstrata